Fear of a Black Hat is a 1993 American mockumentary film on the evolution and state of American hip hop music. The film's title is derived from the 1990 Public Enemy album Fear of a Black Planet. First screened at Sundance Film Festival on January 24, 1993, and later released on June 3, 1994, Fear of a Black Hat co-stars and was written, produced and directed by Rusty Cundieff in his directorial debut.

Plot

The film is a comedic mockumentary depicting the perspective of a filmmaker as she trails a hardcore gangsta rap group called N.W.H. ("Niggaz With Hats"), a play on the name of the popular group N.W.A. In many ways, Fear of a Black Hat is similar to the satirical film about early 1980s heavy metal, This is Spinal Tap.

The members of N.W.H. are:
Ice Cold (Cundieff), the main rapper and the intelligent and vulgar backbone of the group. 
Tasty Taste (Larry B. Scott), the ultra-violent secondary rapper who always seems to be armed with a variety of dangerous assault weaponry. His name is spelled "Tasty-Taste" in the credits but not in other parts of the movie.
Tone Def (Mark Christopher Lawrence), the esoteric DJ who is talented enough to scratch with his buttocks and his penis (the latter is not shown directly, but strongly and humorously implied). His name is spelled "Tone-Def" in the credits but not in other parts of the movie.

The film is told from the point of view of Nina Blackburn (Kasi Lemmons), a sociologist who analyzes hip hop as a form of communication for her degree. She chooses N.W.H. as the subject of her thesis and follows them around for a year. She familiarizes herself with the band members, their beliefs, and their often strange behavior.

The members wear outrageous headwear during their performances. This is explained as an act of rebellion, remembering their slave ancestors, who had to work bare-headed in the sun. According to N.W.H., hats are a symbol for resistance and revolution since their hatless ancestors were too tired from working all day in the sun to revolt. This is a typical example of the bizarre logic the group uses to explain the deeper meanings behind their otherwise crude and base music and images.

A steady source of comedy is N.W.H.'s use of over-the-top graphic language (e.g. sex, violence and rantings against the police), which detractors see as a cheap means to sell records, but in their eyes is essential to convey a "socially relevant message". They offer jaw-dropping explanations why songs such as "Booty Juice" and "Come and Pet the P.U.S.S.Y." are in fact deep and socially significant, and that detractors obviously do not truly understand the "real meaning". Throughout the movie, it is difficult to tell if the members of N.W.H. truly believe what they are saying, or are just portraying an image.

A lot of time also goes into describing N.W.H.'s feud with another rap group, the Jam Boys. The groups constantly insult and discredit each other, even sometimes resulting in brandishing weapons. At one point, N.W.H. brings to light evidence that the Jam Boys' lead rapper attended a prep school, directly threatening his street credibility.

A macabre running gag—inspired by This Is Spinal Tap—involves their white managers dying under mysterious circumstances (the group originally insist that they "wasn't in town when the shit happened"). They explain to Nina that their first few managers were black—in fact, were their relatives—and that they decided switching to white managers would be better for their families and the black community.

N.W.H.'s internal matters turn sour when Ice Cold cuts down his involvement because he wants to participate in a film, and Cheryl C. (Rose Jackson), a groupie, hooks up with Tasty-Taste. Although she is clearly more interested in his money than in him, Tasty lets her take over his life. When Tasty finds Cheryl and Ice Cold in bed, N.W.H. is no more.

The group breaks up and each member launches a solo career. Ice dedicates himself to house music; Tasty brings out a diss track in which he curses Ice; and Tone Def becomes a hippie (with obvious references to "flower rappers," such as P.M. Dawn). None sees much success until they ultimately reunite for a triumphant comeback in which their differences have been set aside, at least for the time being.

Parody/satirical references
The members of N.W.H. were created by using combinations of different aspects of different rappers and other people in the rap industry, as opposed to each of them satirizing a specific individual. For instance, Tasty Taste's violent personality and lyrics, short stature, and Jheri curl hairstyle are similar to the rapper Eazy-E from N.W.A, while his dress and name can just as easily be attributed to Flavor Flav from Public Enemy.

Similarly, Ice Cold's name can be said to be a parody of the many different rappers that use the word "Ice" in their names such as Ice Cube and Ice-T, but it can also be said that he easily parodies others such as L.L. Cool J and Snoop Dogg, as well as other rappers. By not centering their parody on one particular person or group, N.W.H. had the flexibility to satirize a wide range of artists, groups, and events in the world of hip hop.

The film satirizes the testosterone-fueled gangsta rap scene, which is obsessed by materialism, street credibility, sex, and violence. It also spoofs and lampoons alternative hip hop, political hip hop, and Afrocentric rap groups. Many hip hop controversies are spoofed as well, including feuds, racial appropriation, censorship, greedy record companies, and many others.

Characters
Along with the film's title and its central characters, there are other characters seen briefly who are parodies of real-life prominent figures in hip-hop:

 Jike Spingleton: a portmanteau of filmmakers John Singleton and Spike Lee (the character criticizes both filmmakers for "stealing" his look and cinematic styles)
 M.C. Slammer: M.C. Hammer
 Parsley, Sage, Rosemary and Thyme: Salt-N-Pepa
 Vanilla Sherbet: Vanilla Ice
 Yo Highness: Queen Latifah
 Ice Tray, Ice Box, Ice Coffee, Ice Berg, etc.: variations of the name "Ice" and the overuse of it in general in the rap industry. 
 The Jam Boys: The Fat Boys
 Marty Rabinow: N.W.H.'s manager; his name is similar to Rainbow, which is a joke on Jewish names containing colors (e.g. Goldman, Goldberg, Greenberg, Silverberg); he is also a parody of stereotypical Jewish managers of African-American performers, such as N.W.A's Jerry Heller. Rabinow is portrayed as a decent man whom N.W.H. likes and who provides them with sound, honest management. However, like those who preceded him, Marty dies—as a result of a self-inflicted gunshot under very bizarre comedic circumstances.

Production
On the DVD commentary, director Rusty Cundieff stated that the final budget was $999,999.99. He claimed the financiers wanted to be able to tell people that they weren't spending a million dollars on the film.

Music

Songs
 "Booty Juice": The song's video spoofs the prototypical hip hop "pool scene" found in many videos, with N.W.H. surrounded by a bevy of scantily clad girls.
 "Come and Pet the P.U.S.S.Y.": A solo track from Ice Cold's post-N.W.H. group, The Ice Plant. It is based on "Everybody Dance Now" by C&C Music Factory. The main joke is that a petite Asian girl lip-syncs the powerful voice of a heavy-set African-American woman without the latter getting credit for it. This features the conflict Martha Wash had with C&CMF in the track "Everybody Dance Now".
 "Fuck the Security Guards": A send-up of "Fuck Tha Police" by N.W.A.
 "A Gangsta's Life Ain't Fun": Based on "New Jack Hustler (Nino's Theme)" by Ice-T, spoofing its thinly-veiled admiration for sex, crime, and drugs. This is also mirrored in the title, because the video implies that a gangsta's life is fun. The song is not found on the soundtrack album, as the "Gangsta's Life" segment was only inserted into the VHS and DVD releases of the film. 
 "Guerillas in the Midst": Based on "Guerillas in tha Mist" by Da Lench Mob, the song's backdrop is centered on the 1992 Los Angeles riots.
 "Grab Yo Stuff": The episode draws upon the 1990 arrest of three members of 2 Live Crew in Broward County, Florida for performing songs from their album As Nasty as They Wanna Be; the group had been warned that performances of certain songs would lead to arrest. N.W.H. sacrifices its artistic integrity/gangsta attitude in order to avoid trouble, changing the song "Grab Yo Dick" into "Grab Yo Stuff" when police threaten to arrest N.W.H. The group is arrested after Ice Cold accidentally hits himself in the groin while on stage and blurts out "My dick."
 "Granny Said Kick Yo Ass": Tasty Taste's solo single, based on "Mama Said Knock You Out" by LL Cool J.
 "Ice Froggy Frog": A parody of "Who Am I (What's My Name)?" by Snoop Dogg.
 "I'm Just a Human": Performed by Tone Def's post-N.W.H. group New Human Formantics, and based on "Set Adrift on Memory Bliss" by P.M. Dawn.
 "Kill Whitey": Not actually played in the movie, but discussed with Nina Blackburn in an interview regarding N.W.H.'s highly controversial lyrics. The group explains that the title "Kill Whitey" does not actually refer to violence against whites, but instead is a reference to their former manager Whitey DeLuca, who allegedly scammed the band out of a sum of money. He later ended up dead, but the group "wasn't in town when the shit happened." Whitey DeLuca was not actually white, he was "olive-complected", according to Ice Cold.
 "My Peanuts"': An early Ice Cold solo song based on "My Penis" by N.W.A, which itself is a parody of "My Adidas" by Run-D.M.C.
 "Wear Yo Hat (Buried and Bald)": Based on Public Enemy songs such as "Don't Believe the Hype" and "Bring the Noise", with Ice Cold and Tasty Taste vocally mimicking Public Enemy's Chuck D. and Flavor Flav.
 "White Cops on Dope": Only available on the motion picture soundtrack and DVD bonus features. The song is a musical parody of the Tubes' "White Punks on Dope", and is based on the trend of rappers working with rock bands (such as the Run-D.M.C./Aerosmith version of "Walk This Way") in an effort to cross over to mainstream audiences. Ric Ocasek of the Cars is featured on the track.
 "Santa Claus Is Coming": The only song title mentioned from the group's Christmas album Ho Ho Hoe's.  It is intimated that the title is a sexual double entendre rather than a cover of "Santa Claus is Coming to Town".

Albums
 P.U.S.S. Why?
 Straight Outta Da Butt - A parody of N.W.A's Straight Outta Compton
 Kill Whitey
 Garden Hoe's
 Ho Ho Hoe's - a Christmas album
 Guerillas in the Midst - A parody of Da Lench Mob's Guerillas in tha Mist
 Fear of a Black Hat - A parody of Public Enemy's Fear of a Black Planet
 The Black in the Hat Comes Back - the planned reunion album

Managers
 (a cousin of the group)
 (a cousin of the group)
 (a cousin of the group)
 Whitey DeLuca
 Guy Friesch
 Marty Rabinow
 Reggie Clay

Soundtrack
The original soundtrack was released by Avatar Records on June 1, 1994. The soundtrack has eleven songs however the song from the film A Gangsta's Life Ain't Fun was not included in the soundtrack.

 Wear Yo Hat - N.W.H.
 My Peanuts - Ice Cold
 Guerrillas in the Midst - N.W.H.
 Booty Juice - N.W.H.
 F**k the Security Guards - N.W.H.
 A Gangsta's Life Ain't Fun - N.W.H.
 Come Pet the P.U.S.S.Y. - The Ice Plant
 I'm Just a Human Being - New Human Formantics
 Granny Said Kick Yo Ass - Extreme Use of Force
 Grab Yo Stuff - N.W.H.
 White Cops On Dope - N.W.H. feat. Ric Ocasek
 Ice Froggy Frog - N.W.H.

Reception
Although a critical success, Fear of a Black Hat was a financial flop.

Janet Maslin of The New York Times wrote:

Owen Gleiberman of Entertainment Weekly gave the film a B-grade, opining that although it "never achieves the dizzying cinema verite swirl that made Spinal Tap such a timeless satire [...] Cundieff has what nearly every commentator on the rap scene has lacked: a first-class bull detector."

Roger Ebert wrote, in a three-star review, that the film "is not as fearless and sharp-edged as it could be—but it provides a lot of laughs, and barbecues a few sacred cows." He added: 

A decidedly more mixed review came from Peter Rainer of the Los Angeles Times, who wrote that "the idea is so funny that for a long time the film coasts on our good will. But it should be funnier than it is. Writer-director Rusty Cundieff, who also stars, along with Larry B. Scott and Mark Christopher Lawrence, as one of the three members of the rap group N.W.H., has a loose-limbed comic sense, and there are hilarious bits poking through the tedium. What the movie lacks is any kind of smart, sociological sense. It's a defanged spoof."

On Rotten Tomatoes, the film holds a rating of 83% from 23 reviews.

Year-end lists 
 Honorable mention –  Glenn Lovell, San Jose Mercury News
 Honorable mention – Howie Movshovitz, The Denver Post
 Honorable mention – Michael MacCambridge, Austin American-Statesman

See also
 CB4
 List of hood films

References

External links

 
 
 
 

1993 films
1990s mockumentary films
American independent films
American satirical films
1990s hip hop films
Hood comedy films
American mockumentary films
Films directed by Rusty Cundieff
Films scored by Jimmy Manzie
ITC Entertainment films
The Samuel Goldwyn Company films
African-American comedy films
1993 directorial debut films
1993 comedy films
1990s English-language films
1990s American films